The 1992 Pacific Cup may refer to:
1992 Pacific Cup (ice hockey), the 1992 edition of the Ivan Hlinka Memorial Tournament
1992 Pacific Cup (rugby league), the 1992 edition of the rugby league Pacific Cup
1992 Pacific Cup (tennis), the Taipei leg of the 1992 ATP Tour